Bab Sidi Kacem is one of the gates of the Medina of Tunis, the old capital of Tunisia.

It was built in the Ottoman period at the same time as Bab Laassal, Bab Sidi Abdessalem and Bab El Gorjani.

References

Sidi Kacem